Coleophora aliena is a moth of the family Coleophoridae. It is found in Spain.

References

aliena
Moths described in 1987
Moths of Europe